Coralie Trinh Thi (born 11 April 1976) is a former pornographic actress, also known for writing and directing with Virginie Despentes the film Baise-moi (2000). During her career as a porn performer, she was generally just credited as Coralie. She won a Hot d'Or Award for Best European Actress in 1996, and she received a Hot d'Or Honorary Award in 2009.

She acted in the Gaspar Noé-directed short film Sodomites that was made as a safe-sex promo for French television in the late 1990s.

Bibliography
 Trinh Thi, Coralie. La Voie Humide — Une Œuvre au Rouge. Vauvert: Au diable Vauvert, 2007. 
 Trinh Thi, Coralie. Osez... la sodomie. Paris: La Musardine, 2007. 
 Trinh Thi, Coralie. Betty Monde.  Vauvert: Au diable Vauvert, 2002.

References

External links
 
 
 
 

1976 births
French pornographic film actresses
French film directors
French people of German descent
French people of Vietnamese descent
Living people
Actresses from Paris